A Life in Parts is a 2016 memoir by Bryan Cranston that explores his various television and film appearances. Most of the book focuses on Cranston's most famous role, Walter White from Breaking Bad.

References 

2016 non-fiction books
American memoirs
Breaking Bad
Orion Books books
Charles Scribner's Sons books